Gregers Christian Münter (18 December 1907 – 31 March 1988) was a Danish Officer and later sports shooter. He participated in the Danish resistance against the German forces during Operation Safari, afterwards he was part of the Danish resistance movement where he was involved in several actions against the Germans. He competed in the 25 m pistol event at the 1948 Summer Olympics.

References

1907 births
1988 deaths
People from Copenhagen
Danish male sport shooters
Olympic shooters of Denmark
Shooters at the 1948 Summer Olympics
Sportspeople from Copenhagen